The QF 3-pounder Hotchkiss or in French use Canon Hotchkiss à tir rapide de 47 mm were a family of long-lived light  naval guns introduced in 1886 to defend against new, small and fast vessels such as torpedo boats and later submarines.  There were many variants produced, often under license which ranged in length from 32 to 50 calibers but 40 caliber was the most common version.  They were widely used by the navies of a number of nations and often used by both sides in a conflict.  They were also used ashore as coastal defense guns and later as an anti-aircraft gun, whether on improvised or specialized HA/LA mounts.

Operational history

French service

The French Navy used two versions of the Hotchkiss 3-pounder: the short-barreled  M1885 and the long-barreled  M1902, which had a larger muzzle velocity than its predecessor.  The French L/40 M1885 and the British QF 3-pounder were largely the same gun. Like the British who paired their 3-pounders with the larger QF 6-pounder Hotchkiss the French often paired theirs with the Canon de 65 mm Modèle 1891 sometimes called a 9-pounder in English publications.  The 3-pounder was primarily used as anti-torpedo boat defense aboard armored cruisers, destroyers, ironclads, pre-dreadnought battleships, protected cruisers and submarines.  During World War I, the role of the guns changed from anti-torpedo boat defense to anti-aircraft defense and new high angle mounts were developed but were found to be ineffective.

The Liberté-class and Danton-class battleships mounted the gun, in addition to the cruisers Jules Michelet, Ernest Renan, and those of the Edgar Quinet-class. It was used as the standard French shipboard anti-aircraft gun during World War I, being replaced by the Canon de 75 mm modèle 1908.

After World War I the majority of 3-pounders in the anti-aircraft role were replaced with either the anti-aircraft version of the Canon de 75 modèle 1897 or the Canon de 75 mm modèle 1924.
French ships armed with the L/40 M1885 and L/50 M1902 include:

 Amiral Charner-class cruisers
 Amphitrite-class submarines
 Arquebuse-class destroyers
 Bouvines-class coast defense ships
 Branlebas-class destroyers
 Bretagne-class battleships
 Charlemagne-class battleships
 Claymore-class destroyers
 Clorinde-class submarines
 Courbet-class battleships
 Danton-class battleships
 D'Estrées-class cruisers
 Dupleix-class cruisers
 Dupuy de Lôme-class submarines
 Durandal-class destroyers
 Framee-class destroyers
 Gloire-class cruisers
 Gueydon-class cruisers
 Gustave Zédé-class submarines
 Leon Gambetta-class cruisers
 Liberte-class battleships
 Marceau-class ironclads
 Normandie-class battleships
 O'Byrne-class submarines
 Pertuisane-class destroyers
 Republique-class battleships
 French ironclad Amiral Baudin
 French battleship Brennus
 French battleship Carnot
 French battleship Charles Martel

Australian service
A 3-pounder Hotchkiss was used on an improvised mounting in a battle that resulted in Australia's first prisoners of World War 2 being captured near Berbera in 1940.  The guns are now used in a Three Pound Saluting Gun Battery at the Garden Island Naval Base.

Austro-Hungarian service

The  Austro-Hungarian Navy used two versions of the Hotchkiss 3-pounder.  The first was the short  SFK L/33 H of 1890 produced under license by Skoda.  The second was the long  SFK L/44 S of 1897 produced under license by Skoda.  These two guns were the primary rapid fire anti-torpedo boat guns of many ships built or refitted between 1890 and 1918.  On 16 August 1914 at the Battle of Antivari, the Austro-Hungarian protected cruiser SMS Zenta was sunk by a combined Anglo-French force.  Both sides in the battle were armed with Hotchkiss guns.

Austro-Hungarian ships armed with the L/33 and L/44 include:

 Erzherzog Karl-class battleships
 Habsburg-class battleships
 Huszár-class destroyers
 Kaiman-class torpedo boats
 Kaiser Franz Joseph I-class cruisers
 Monarch-class coastal defense ships
 Panther-class cruisers
 Radetzky-class battleships
 U-10-class submarines
 SMS Boa
 SMS Kaiser Karl VI
 SMS Kaiserin und Königin Maria Theresia
 SMS Kronprinz Erzherzog Rudolf
 SMS Kronprinzessin Erzherzogin Stephanie
 SMS Sankt Georg
 Zenta-class cruisers

Chinese service
China adopted the Hotchkiss 3-pounder in the 1880s, to arm its cruisers and smaller auxiliaries; the Hai Yung-class cruisers of the Imperial Chinese Navy built by AG Vulcan Stettin were armed with Nordenfelt 3-pounder guns firing the same ammunition. During the First Sino-Japanese war, ships of both sides were armed with Hotchkiss 3-pounder guns.

Chinese ships armed with 3-pounder guns include:

 Chao Ho-class cruisers
 Yongfeng-class coastal defense ships
 Zhiyuen-class cruisers
 Chinese cruiser Hai Chi
 Chinese cruiser Jingyuan
 Chinese cruiser Laiyuan

Italian service
Italy adopted the Hotchkiss 3-pounder in the 1880s to arm its armored cruisers, battleships, protected cruisers, torpedo boats and torpedo cruisers.  Ships on both sides of the Italo-Turkish war were armed with 3-pounder guns.  The Italians carried Hotchkiss and Vickers guns, while the Ottoman Navy carried Nordenfelt guns.

Italian ships armed with 3-pounder guns include:

 Folgore-class cruisers
 Giuseppe Garibaldi-class cruisers
 Pegaso-class torpedo boats
 Regina Elena-class battleships
 Regina Margherita-class battleships
 Italian cruiser Tripoli

Japanese service

Japan adopted the Hotchkiss 3-pounder 5-barrel revolver cannon in the 1880s and later adopted the simpler single-barrel quick-firing weapon.  The Japanese versions of the 3-pounder were known as Yamanouchi guns and were largely identical to their British equivalents.  The Japanese also had a related 30 caliber 2½-pounder gun from Elswick, the Yamanouchi Mk I.  During the Russo-Japanese War, ships of both sides were armed with Hotchkiss 3-pounder guns.  The Japanese found them to be ineffective and removed them after the war.

Japanese ships armed with 3-pounder guns include:

 Asama-class cruisers
 Fuji-class battleships
 Kasagi-class cruisers
 Kasuga-class cruisers
 Katori-class battleships
 Kongō-class ironclads
 Matsushima-class cruisers
 Niitaka-class cruisers
 Shikishima-class battleships
 Suma-class cruisers
 Tsukuba-class cruisers
 Japanese battleship Asahi
 Japanese battleship Mikasa
 Japanese cruiser Akitsushima
 Japanese cruiser Azuma
 Japanese cruiser Chihaya
 Japanese cruiser Chiyoda
 Japanese cruiser Miyako
 Japanese cruiser Soya
 Japanese cruiser Takasago
 Japanese cruiser Tatsuta (1894)
 Japanese cruiser Yaeyama
 Japanese cruiser Yakumo
 Japanese cruiser Yoshino
 Japanese gunboat Oshima
 Japanese ironclad Fusō
 Japanese submarine tender Karasaki

Polish service
Polish  Hotchkiss guns named the wz.1885 gun, were used on first ships of the Polish Navy, received after World War I, like ex-German torpedo boats and minesweepers. By the time of World War II most had been replaced on naval ships but several stored guns were used in combat on improvised stationary mounts by Land Coastal Defence units in the Battle of Kępa Oksywska in September 1939.

Romanian service
The Romanian Navy used the Škoda-produced version of the gun. The gun was used as secondary and later tertiary armament on the Romanian monitors of the Mihail Kogălniceanu class. It also served as the main armament of the Căpitan Nicolae Lascăr Bogdan class of armored multi-purpose boats, each of the 8 boats carrying one gun.

Russian service

Russia adopted the Hotchkiss 3-pounder 5-barrel revolver cannon in the 1880s, and later adopted the less complicated single-barrel 43 caliber quick-firing weapon. The 5-barrel guns were equipped on the Ekaterina II-class battleships commissioned in 1889 but by 1892 the battleship Dvenadsat Apostolov and her successors had single-barrel weapons.  In 1888 licensed production of a Russian variant started at the Obukhov State Plant.  During the Russo-Japanese War, ships of both sides were armed with Hotchkiss 3-pounders, which were found to be ineffective against Japanese torpedo boats and were removed from first-line warships after the war.  The Evstafi class, commissioned in 1910 ceased carrying the weapon but they were later fitted to patrol vessels and river craft during World War I and at least 62 weapons were converted to anti-aircraft guns by 1917.

Russian ships armed with 3-pounder guns include:

 Admiral Ushakov-class coastal defense ships
 Amur-class minelayers
 Bayan-class cruisers
 Bogatyr-class cruisers
 Borodino-class battleships
 Derzky-class destroyers
 Izumrud-class cruisers
 Peresvet-class battleships
 Petropavlovsk-class battleships
 Russian battleship Navarin
 Russian battleship Potemkin
 Russian battleship Retvizan
 Russian battleship Rostislav
 Russian battleship Sissoi Veliky
 Russian battleship Tri Sviatitelia
 Russian battleship Tsesarevich
 Russian cruiser Admiral Kornilov
 Russian cruiser Admiral Nakhimov (1885)
 Russian cruiser Almaz
 Russian cruiser Askold
 Russian cruiser Boyarin
 Russian cruiser Gromoboi
 Russian cruiser Pamiat Azova
 Russian cruiser Rossia
 Russian cruiser Rurik (1892)
 Russian cruiser Rurik (1906)
 Russian cruiser Svetlana
 Russian cruiser Varyag
 Russian cruiser Vladimir Monomakh
 Russian yacht Standart

United Kingdom service
In 1886 this gun was the first of the modern Quick-firing (QF) artillery to be adopted by the Royal Navy as the  built under licence by the Elswick Ordnance Company.

By the middle of World War I the Hotchkiss gun was obsolescent and was gradually replaced by the more powerful Ordnance QF 3 pounder Vickers gun. Of the 2,950 produced it is estimated that 1,948 were still available in 1939 for RN use.  The availability, simplicity and light weight of the gun kept it in use in small vessels and many were later brought back into service on merchant vessels used for auxiliary duties in World War II or as saluting guns and sub-calibre guns for gunnery practice until the 1950s. Early in WWII, it was also pressed into service in ports around the British Empire, to defend against possible incursions by motor torpedo boats, until the modern QF 6 pounder 10 cwt gun became available. Two, brought from Gibraltar in the late 1990s, are still in use on Victory Green in the Falkland Islands for saluting purposes.

Royal Navy ships armed with QF 3-pounder Hotchkiss guns included:

 Admiral-class ironclads
 Adventure-class cruisers
 Alert-class sloops
 Arrogant-class cruisers
 Astraea-class cruisers
 Blake-class cruisers
 Bramble-class gunboats
 C-class cruisers
 Cadmus-class sloops
 Canopus-class battleships
 Centurion-class battleships
 Challenger-class cruisers
 Colossus-class battleships
 Condor-class sloops
 Conqueror-class monitors
 Cressy-class cruisers
 Cyclops-class monitors
 Devastation-class ironclads
 Devonshire-class cruisers
 Diadem-class cruisers
 Drake-class cruisers
 Duncan-class battleships
 Eclipse-class cruisers
 Formidable-class battleships
 Forward-class cruisers
 Gorgon-class monitors
 Highflyer-class cruisers
 King Edward VII-class battleships
 King George V-class battleships
 Lord Nelson-class battleships
 Majestic-class battleships
 Marathon-class cruisers
 Monarch-class coastal defense ships
 Monmouth-class cruisers
 Orion-class battleships
 Orlando-class cruisers
 Pathfinder-class cruisers
 Pearl-class cruisers
 Pelorus-class cruisers
 Phoenix-class sloops
 Powerful-class cruisers
 Redbreast-class gunboats
 Royal Sovereign-class battleships
 Sentinel-class cruisers
 Topaze-class cruisers
 Trafalgar-class ironclads

United States service 

The US Navy used several types of 3-pounder guns from multiple manufacturers and it is difficult to determine from references which type a particular ship carried. Hotchkiss 3-pounder 5-barrel revolving cannons were used, along with single-barrel quick-firing single-shot Hotchkiss 3-pounders. Both are called rapid-firing (RF) in references.  Ships on both sides in the Spanish–American War were armed with Hotchkiss 3-pounders.  By 1910 the US was building the dreadnought-type South Carolina class, with a secondary armament composed entirely of 3-inch (76 mm) guns. Although removed from first-line warships by World War I, some 3-pounders were fitted on patrol vessels, with a few weapons serving on those ships through World War II.

 Amphitrite-class monitors
 Asheville-class gunboats
 Chester-class cruisers
 Columbia-class cruisers
 Connecticut-class battleships
 Delaware-class battleships
 Maine-class battleships
 Mississippi-class battleships
 New Orleans-class cruisers
 New York-class battleships
 Northampton-class cruisers
 Pennsylvania-class cruisers
 Pensacola-class cruisers
 Portland-class cruisers
 South Carolina-class battleships
 St. Louis-class cruisers
 Tennessee-class cruisers
 Virginia-class battleships
 Wilmington-class gunboats
 Wyoming-class battleships
 Yorktown-class gunboats

Ammunition
The most common types of ammunition available for 3-pounder guns were low yield Steel shells and common lyddite shells.  In World War II higher yield high explosive rounds were produced.

Photo gallery

Surviving examples
 The Jardines Noonday gun at Causeway Bay, Hong Kong.
 A gun at the Royal Queensland Yacht Squadron, Manly, Queensland, Australia.
 Two guns on "elastic frame" mounting in the Casemate de l'Aschenbach, Uffheim, Haut-Rhin, France.
 A saluting battery of multiple guns at Fort Queenscliff, Victoria, Australia.
 Four guns on the tall ship Libertad, which serves as a school ship in the Argentine Navy; all fully operational as saluting battery or multipurpose defense.
 National Museum of the United States Navy has one on display with 1910 brass gun sight and slide manufactured at the Naval Gun Factory.

Weapons of comparable role, performance and era
 QF 3 pounder Nordenfelt : Nordenfelt equivalent
 QF 3 pounder Vickers : Vickers equivalent
 5 cm SK L/40 gun : German equivalent

Licensed production

 Elswick Ordnance Company
 Obukhov State Plant
 Skoda Works
 William Cramp & Sons

Wars

 First Sino-Japanese War
 Spanish–American War
 Russo-Japanese War
 Italo-Turkish War
 First Balkan War
 Second Balkan War
 World War I
 Winter War
 World War II

Users

Notes

References

External links 

 Handbook of the 3 pounder Hotchkiss quick-firing gun Land service 1892, 1900 at State Library of Victoria
 Handbook for Hotchkiss 6-pr and 3-pr. quick-firing guns 1896 at State Library of Victoria
 Tony DiGiulian, British Hotchkiss 3-pdr (1.4 kg) (1.85"/40 (47 mm)) QF Marks I and II
 DiGiulian, Tony, US 3-pounders
 DiGiulian, Tony, Russian Hotchkiss 3-pounders

47 mm artillery
Naval guns of France
Naval guns of the United Kingdom
Victorian-era weapons of the United Kingdom
Coastal artillery
Weapons and ammunition introduced in 1886
World War I naval weapons of the United Kingdom
Naval guns of the United States
Russo-Japanese war weapons of Russia
Russo-Japanese war weapons of Japan